Pacific Insects Monographs  was a scientific journal published by the Entomology Department, Bishop Museum, between 1961 and 1986.

References

External links 
 

Publications established in 1961
Publications disestablished in 1986
Entomology journals and magazines
English-language journals
Academic journals published by museums
Bishop Museum academic journals